It may refer to: 
 Guayana natural region, one of the eight geographic-natural regions of Venezuela
 Guayana Region, Venezuela, one of the nine Administrative regions of Venezuela